Chongqing University of Technology (CQUT) is a public research university in Chongqing. It was founded as Shiji Public School on 18 September 1940 by ordnance expert .

Overview
The university was established on 18 September 1940, it now has around 26,000 students and 1,590 teachers.

Chongqing University of Technology used to be named the Chongqing Technology Institute, one of four universities with a traditional ordnance department. It originated from the 11th Technical School of the Department of War Industry, which was founded on 18 September 1940. The 11th Technical School of the Department of War Industry was called 21-Factory Technical School in short, and its external anonym was "Shiji Public School". Although its public identity was technical school, it acted to train professionals in weapon production for the Nationalist government.

Today the university is strong in the fields of engineering, economic management and basic engineering — the disciplines of automobile manufacturing and research in drive technology, thermal engine technology and transmission technology are top in the state. It has become one of the benchmark schools in China for its research in automobile design, thermal engine and automobile suspension systems. It established Chongqing Automobile Institute and the first CVT (Continuously Variable Transmission) institute in China in a joint capital partnership with Changan Ford, Suzuki, Mazda, and Honda.

The university has diploma students, undergraduates and postgraduates. It grants bachelor's degree, master's degree and titles of researchers and associate researchers in institutes in Chongqing. Today it is a common tertiary institution supervised by the Chongqing government and Ministry of Ordnance Industry (currently under the auspices of China South Industries Group Corporation).

History
On 18 September 1940, its origin, the 11th Technical School of the Department of War Industry of National Government of the Republic of China was founded. It was jointly managed by Ministry of Defense and Department of War Industry of central National Government. In order to keep it confidential it was called "Shiji Public School". The principal was Lieutenant General Li Chenggan.

In November 1949, the army of the Communist Party took Chongqing by storm. The 11th Technical School was renamed to Chongqing Polytechnic College, and controlled by military government of Southwest Bureau of the CCP.

In April 1965, the institution was updated and renamed to Chongqing Industry College, under the fifth Ministry of Machine building. It had several key laboratories of Ministry of Defense and Ministry of Ordnance Industry. In fact it was one of the universities with ordnance department which served for national defense.

In May 1999, it was renamed to Chongqing Institute of Technology and granted master's degrees. It was still controlled by Ministry of Ordnance Industry and later jointly supervised by the Chongqing government and Ordnance Industry Corporation.

In March 2009, Ministry of Education of the PRC agreed to rename it "Chongqing University of Technology", and then the establishment of several key laboratories for automobile manufacturing was reported.

On 16 May 2009, the university formally accepted the name, changing to "Chongqing University of Technology". It is jointly supervised by Chongqing government and China South Industries Group Corporation. It is one of the remaining four universities with ordnance department.

Faculties
Full-time teachers of Chongqing University of Technology account for 54% of the total number of teachers, which ranks top in Chongqing City and the southwestern area of China. In recent five years it has in sequence undertaken 1,390 state-level and province-level major research projects and horizontal cooperation projects including through the National Natural Science Foundation and National Social Science Foundation. Two of them have gained the National Science and Technology Award. Its vehicle engineering is state-level key discipline, and its province-level key disciplines are biological engineering, drive and thermal engine, automation, basic accounting and pharmaceutical engineering. The university also has over 30 university-level institutes and over 160 out-of-campus practice bases.

Campus

Old campus: No. 4 Xingsheng Road, Yangjiaping (杨家坪), Chongqing. Postcode: 400050.

It has buildings with green tiles which were the site of Crown Corps of Military Council of National Government and headquarters of the 8th theater. Now they are key cultural relics preservation sites in Chongqing City. Most of the old campus is being destroyed and torn down. Trees are being removed and sent to the new campus while buildings are being torn down. Most faculty and almost all students are now located on the main campus.

Main/Huaxi campus: No. 69 Hongguang Road, Banan District, Chongqing City. Postcode: 400054.

Longxing campus: No. 459 Pufu Road, Yubei District, Chongqing. Postcode: 401135.

References

External links
 Chongqing University of Technology website (Chinese)
 Chongqing University of Technology website (English)

1940 establishments in China
Educational institutions established in 1940
Universities and colleges in Chongqing
Technical universities and colleges in China